Mercedes Eng is a Canadian writer, poet and educator based in Vancouver, British Columbia. She has published multiple poetry books: Mercenary English (2013); yt mama (2020); and Prison Industrial Complex Explodes (2017). Her poetic work considers themes such as race relations and socioeconomics. In 2018 she won the Dorothy Livesay Poetry Prize.

Early life and education 
Eng was born in Medicine Hat, Alberta. She is of mixed (white and Chinese) lineage, which she explores in her 2020 book my yt mama.

Publications
 February 2010 (2010) - Chapbook
 knuckle sandwich (2011) - Chapbook
 Mercenary English (2013, reissued in 2016 and 2018) - Book
 Prison Industrial Complex Explodes (2017) - Book
 my yt mama (2020) - Book

References 

Year of birth missing (living people)
Living people
People from Medicine Hat
Writers from Alberta
Canadian women poets
21st-century Canadian poets